The PP-93 submachine gun was developed in the 1990s at the KBP Instrument Design Bureau in Tula as a non-folding version of earlier PP-90 clandestine submachine gun, for use by security and law enforcement units. It is operated on blowback principle and has good controllability of full automatic fire.

Features
Single/ full auto fire
Rate of fire: 600-700 rounds per minute
Useful range: 100 m
Option to mount a detachable silencer G-PP-93 "Г-ПП-93" and laser sight LP-93 "ЛП-93".

Users

 : Used by rapid response units of riot police (OMON) and some other units of the Ministry of Internal Affairs
 : Used by the special forces
 : Used by the Special Forces

See also
 List of Russian weaponry

References

Sources 
 9-мм пистолет-пулемет. Техническое описание и инструкция по эксплуатации ПП-93.00.000 ТО — 1994 г.
 Прицел лазерный. Паспорт ЛП-93.000 ПС
 А. И. Благовестов. То, из чего стреляют в СНГ: Справочник стрелкового оружия. / под общ.ред. А. Е. Тараса. Минск, «Харвест», 2000. стр.221-223

External links

 PP-93 submachine gun - Modern Firearms

9×18mm Makarov submachine guns
Blowback-operated firearms 
Submachine guns of Russia
Telescoping bolt submachine guns
KBP Instrument Design Bureau products
Weapons and ammunition introduced in 1993